Cult of Luna is a Swedish post-metal band from Umeå founded in 1998. They are known for post-metal music similar to the contemporary bands Neurosis and Isis. The band was signed to Earache Records in the early 2000s and released five albums, including the commercially successful albums Salvation (2004) and Somewhere Along the Highway (2006). After an extended period of inactivity, Cult of Luna returned with its Indie Recordings debut Vertikal (2013) and companion EP Vertikal II (2013), both drawing inspiration from Fritz Lang's 1927 film, Metropolis. In 2016 the band released their space-themed collaborative album, Mariner, featuring American vocalist Julie Christmas.

History

Formation and early releases (1998–2007) 
They formed from the remnants of a Umeå hardcore punk band called Eclipse in 1998. They slowly garnered critical appreciation and underground popularity with early releases Cult of Luna (2001) and The Beyond (2003); however, it is 2004's Salvation that can be considered their 'breakthrough' release. This was followed by Somewhere Along the Highway in 2006, another largely well-received album.

In August 2006, the band released a remake of "Marching to the Heartbeats" from Somewhere Along the Highway entitled "Heartbeats" solely on the internet community MySpace. The song was available for download for a few days and was later removed. The point was to see if the song would be kept alive by file sharing, and was also apparently a statement against the conservative music industry, said keyboardist Anders Teglund in an interview.

Eternal Kingdom (2008–2011) 
In 2008 the band released its fifth album, Eternal Kingdom. It was released in Europe on June 16, followed by its release in the United States on July 8.

In 2009 they released the Fire Was Born DVD including a live performance from 2008, an interview with the band, as well as all of the band's videos.

On October 18, 2009, the band released Eviga riket, a hardback book/audiobook covering the story and themes from Eternal Kingdom. The book and audiobook are bilingual, printed and spoken both in Swedish and English. The audiobook contains new pieces of music and soundscapes written by the band. Eviga riket was released the 23 of February 2010.

Vertikal and Vertikal II (2012–2015) 
On October 8, 2012, the band announced the title of their sixth studio album as Vertikal, as well as the first leg of their upcoming European tour. The release dates were confirmed as November 5, with the European release on January 25, 2013, and the American release four days later on January 29, 2013. A companion EP, Vertikal II was released on September 20, 2013. It includes the three songs with which Cult of Luna intended to conclude Vertikal as well as a remix of "Vicarious Redemption" by Justin Broadrick.

On December 17, 2013, the band announced that they'd be taking a break of sorts for the foreseeable future stating "2013 have been a very active year for us and neither do we want or think it is good to continue in that pace" they also said "Sooner or later we will return in one form or another".

In May 2014 the band curated the Beyond The Redshift festival in London, held across 3 venues with Cult Of Luna closing the festival with a headlining set at the Forum.

New lineup and Mariner with Julie Christmas (2016-2018) 
During the recording sessions and supporting tours for Vertikal, Cult of Luna made two major lineup changes that weren't publicly addressed until 2016. While recording the album in 2012, keyboardist Anders Teglund "left the band unexpectedly" and later was replaced by Kristian Karlsson of Pg Lost. Founding guitarist Erik Olofsson told the band he wished to leave, and his final live performance with the band became 2014's Beyond the Redshift festival. Cult of Luna stated that while he is no longer a full-time member, "he is still a part of the Cult of Luna universe." He has been temporarily replaced by David Johansson of Kongh.

On April 8, 2016, Cult of Luna released its seventh studio album titled Mariner — a collaborative release with the American vocalist Julie Christmas, formerly of Made Out of Babies and Battle of Mice. Contrasting the industrial- and city-focused Vertikal, Mariner explores themes relating to outer space.

Before Mariner was officially released, Cult of Luna had already begun writing new music for their eighth studio album. Persson stated that the band already had the album's concept and theme in mind, stating: "The last few records have been this kind of continuous journey from the forest to the sky and I know where we're going after this."

Johannes Persson stated in an interview in April 2016 that in 2013 he never talked about taking a break as previously reported, "what I wanted to say [...] is that we didn't have anything planned for the future" and added "for sure I never used the word hiatus".

In December 2016 Cult of Luna announced new live release Years in a Day scheduled for April 21, 2017. A live bundle limited to 7000 copies would feature a DVD of a show in Paris from the Somewhere Along the Highway 10th anniversary tour in 2015, 2 CDs featuring the band's performances at the Roadburn Festival in 2013 and 2016, digital audio and some other bonuses. Preorders of Years in a Day started on January 20, 2017 along with preorders of two live vinyl albums from the shows at Roadburn Festival in 2013 and 2016. These are the same as those included on CD in Years in a Day. The two live vinyl albums are limited to 500 copies each. A live triple disc vinyl album from the show at La Gaîté Lyrique in Paris, which is the same as on the DVD in Years in a Day, was also released on April 21, 2017. The vinyl is limited to 1000 copies on orange vinyl with yellow splatter. It was also released on black vinyl and CD.

In November 2017 Cult of Luna announced the release of live album and documentary Mariner Live in April 2018. Prior to the official release, the band released a short version of the documentary on the making of the Mariner album and the tour in support of it on the band's YouTube channel. The live album  features the entire performance of Mariner which was recorded in November 2016 in Kortrijk, Belgium .

A Dawn to Fear (2019–2020) 
At the end of 2018, Cult of Luna announced the beginning of recording sessions and posted teaser photos from the studio on band's social media throughout 2019. A number of 2019 European summer festival appearances were confirmed along the way. On March 20, 2019 the band announced signing a deal with Metal Blade Records and first batch of European tour dates scheduled for autumn 2019. On May 6, 2019, the new song "The Silent Man" became available on all platforms, and the band announced that A Dawn to Fear would be released on 20 September 2019. Loudwire named it one of the 50 best metal albums of 2019.

The Raging River and The Long Road North (2021–present) 
On November 12, 2020 Cult of Luna announced the release of a new EP titled The Raging River for February 5, 2021 through their own newly founded label Red Creek Recordings. "The Raging River feels more like a bridge. A midpoint that needs to be crossed so we can finish what we started with 2019's 'A Dawn to Fear,'" the band adds.

On November 4, 2021, Cult of Luna announced the release of a new album titled The Long Road North for February 11, 2022.

Musical style and influences 
Cult of Luna's sound has progressed from early material being heavily doom metal-influenced to one much less aggressive and more concerned with orchestration. Fans and critics have termed this sound post-metal, progressive metal, sludge metal, and doom metal. The band is considered to be at the forefront of the genre, along with contemporary proponents Neurosis and Isis.

Its songs are often long, slow, repetitive and crushing, heavy sections of distorted guitars often interspersed with orchestral interludes and extended, post-rock-esque forays. The group shuns conventional song structures, opting for a sound that evolves throughout a song, sometimes toward a climactic crescendo, instead of a verse-chorus-verse pattern. That style, incorporating sections of "light and dark" into their music, has led to comparisons with contemporaries such as Isis (with whom they have toured), Callisto and Pelican, as well as the significantly older Neurosis. Former singer Klas Rydberg, however, has stated that decidedly Radiohead are an influence.

Themes 
As the band progressed, the imagery they employed became less overt and less "doom metal". In some ways, the albums showed a shift from anger with modern society as in Cult of Luna, to disgust with the ruling parties in The Beyond and Salvation. The video for single "Leave Me Here" is concerned with propaganda and tacit governmental control over the individual. Similar concerns are addressed in contemporaries Isis' Panopticon, centered on the theme of Big Brother-like government surveillance. Early material made Christian references; to the devil, Faust and the four horsemen of the apocalypse. Over the course of the following albums, these seem to have disappeared, though Salvation does have overarching spiritual themes.

Somewhere Along the Highway is slightly different from the previous releases in its thematic basis. It focuses on personal matters, specifically male loneliness, instead of macroscopic concerns addressed in the previous albums.

Members

Current 
 Magnus Líndberg – percussion, guitar (1998–present)
 Johannes Persson – guitars, vocals (1998–present)
 Andreas Johansson – bass (2002–present)
 Thomas Hedlund – drums (2003–present)
 Fredrik Kihlberg – guitar, vocals (2004–present)
 Kristian Karlsson – keyboards, electronics, vocals (2013–present)

Former 
 Klas Rydberg – vocals (1998–2012)
 Erik Olofsson – guitar (1998–2014)
 Fredrik Renström – bass (1999)
 Marco Hildén – drums (1999–2002)
 Axel Stattin – bass (2000–2002)
 Anders Teglund – keyboards, electronics (2003–2013)

Touring musicians 
 Jonas Nordstrom – keyboards, electronics (2013)
 David Johansson – bass (2013)

Timeline

Discography

Studio albums

EPs 
 Switchblade / Cult of Luna (split with Switchblade) (2000, Trust No One Recordings)
 Bodies / Recluse (Covers of The Smashing Pumpkins and Unbroken songs) (2006, Earache)
 Vertikal II (2013, Indie)
 Råångest (split with The Old Wind) (2015, Pelagic)
 The Raging River (2021, Red Creek)

Live albums 
 Live at Roadburn 2013 (2017, Indie Recordings)
 Somewhere Along the Highway: Live at Roadburn 2016 (2017, Indie Recordings)
 Live at La Gâité Lyrique: Paris (2017, Indie Recordings)

Audio book soundtracks 
 Eviga riket (2010)
 Eternal Music (2014)

Video album 
 Fire Was Born (2009, Earache)
 Years in a Day (2017, Indie)
 Mariner Live (2018, Indie)

Music videos

References

External links
 Official website
 

Post-metal musical groups
Swedish doom metal musical groups
Swedish heavy metal musical groups
Musical groups established in 1999
Earache Records artists
1999 establishments in Sweden